Chatham is a ward in the London Borough of Hackney and forms part of the Hackney South and Shoreditch constituency. The population of this ward at the 2011 Census was 13,232.

1965–1978
Chatham ward has existed since the creation of the London Borough of Hackney on 1 April 1965. It was first used in the 1964 elections, with an electorate of 8,952, returning three councillors.

1978–2002
There was a revision of ward boundaries in Hackney in 1978.

2002–2014
There was a revision of ward boundaries in Hackney in 2002.

The ward returned three councillors to Hackney London Borough Council, with an election every four years. At the local election on 6 May 2010, Luke Akehurst, Sally Mulready, and Guy Nicholson, all Labour Party candidates, were elected. Turnout was 54%, with 4,771 votes cast.

In 2001, Chatham ward had a total population of 10,722. This compares with the average ward population within the borough of 10,674.

For the May 2014 election, the ward was replaced by a new Homerton ward, with some sections going to Lea Bridge ward and Hackney Wick ward.

References

External links
 London Borough of Hackney list of constituencies and councillors.
 Labour Party profile of Luke Akehurst
 Labour Party profile of Sally Mulready
 Labour Party profile of Guy Nicholson
 Councillor Luke Akehurst's blog

Wards of the London Borough of Hackney
2014 disestablishments in England
1965 establishments in England